Jordan Collier (born 7 December 1994) is a Welsh rugby union player who plays for Ospreys regional team as a flanker.

Collier made his debut for the Ospreys regional team in 2014 having previously played for the Neath RFC and Tonmawr RFC.

References

External links 
Ospreys Player Profile

Welsh rugby union players
Ospreys (rugby union) players
Living people
1994 births
Rugby union flankers